On October 12, 2013, a cargo truck carrying 51 people, including 14 children, plunged off a 200-metre cliff, killing everyone on board. This incident is currently tied with the 2018 Pasamayo bus crash as the deadliest road accident in Peruvian history. According to authorities, the truck, which was being used as a makeshift bus, was traveling to a celebration in the Santa Teresa district, when the driver lost control of the bus as it plunged off a 200-meter cliff into the Chaupimayo River below.

See also
List of road accidents 2010–19

References

2013 in Peru
Peru bus disaster
Bus incidents in Peru
Cusco Region
October 2013 events in South America
2013 disasters in Peru